Stico is a 1985 Spanish comedy film directed by Jaime de Armiñán about a broke Roman law professor who offers himself as a slave to an old student in exchange for house and food. It was entered into the 35th Berlin International Film Festival where Fernando Fernán Gómez won the Silver Bear for Best Actor.

Cast
 Fernando Fernán Gómez as Don Leopoldo Contreras de Tejada
 Agustín González as Gonzalo Bárcena
 Carme Elias as María 
 Amparo Baró as Felisa 
 Mercedes Lezcano as Margarita
 Manuel Zarzo as Claudio
 Beatriz Elorrieta
 Manuel Torremocha
 Toa Torán
 Sandra Milhaud
 Bárbara Escamilla
 Vanesa Escamilla
 Manuel Galiana as Luis Cuartero

Reception
Magazine Fotogramas describes the film as "somewhat blurred fable" but that it also has "sufficient ability to maintain the story with dignity".

References

External links

1985 films
Spanish comedy films
1980s Spanish-language films
1985 comedy films
Films directed by Jaime de Armiñán
Films about slavery
1980s Spanish films